Anacrusis marriana is a species of moth of the  family Tortricidae. It is found in Santa Catarina, Brazil.

References

Moths described in 1782
Atteriini
Moths of South America